Arthur J. Ornitz (November 28, 1916 – July 10, 1985) was an American cinematographer.

Early life 
Ornitz was born in New York City, the son of Sadie (née Lesser) and screenwriter Samuel Ornitz, the Hollywood Ten blacklistee. He had a brother, Don, who was a photographer. Ornitz studied film at the University of California, Los Angeles.

Career 
Ornitz made his directing debut with short film Wanted – A Master (1936), which was nominated for the Academy Award for Best Short Subject (One-Reel). Among other films, he shot films such as The Connection (1961), A Thousand Clowns (1965), Charly (1968), The Boys in the Band (1970), The Anderson Tapes, Minnie and Moskowitz (both 1971), Serpico (1973), Death Wish (1974), Next Stop, Greenwich Village (1976), An Unmarried Woman (1978), and Hanky Panky (1982).

Death 
Ornitz died of cancer at his home in Manhattan, New York, on July 10, 1985. He was survived by his mother, his wife and a son. Ornitz's son, Kim H. Ornitz, is a sound mixer.

References

External links 
 

1916 births
1985 deaths
American cinematographers
Deaths from cancer in New York (state)
People from Manhattan
People from New York City